The Coahuila meteorite is a hexahedrite iron meteorite found in Coahuila, Mexico. The large number of fragments has led to many synonyms and many authors think that more than one meteorite is represented by the fragments. Only fragments found in Coahuila, that are hexahedrites and fall into the IIAB group should be called Coahuila meteorite.

The mineral Daubréelite was first described in this meteorite.

References

See also
 Glossary of meteoritics
 

Iron meteorites
Meteorites found in Mexico